Dewsbury is a market town within the Metropolitan Borough of Kirklees, in West Yorkshire, England.

Dewsbury may also refer to:

 Dewsbury (UK Parliament constituency)

People with the surname
 Al Dewsbury (1926-2006), Canadian ice hockey player
 Donald Dewsbury (born 1939), American psychologist
 Kiernan Dewsbury-Hall (born 1998), English football player
 Marc Dewsbury (born 1974), English darts player
 Ralph Dewsbury (1882-1921), British film director
 William Dewsbury (c. 1621–1688), English Quaker minister